The Gola Rainforest National Park (GRNP) was declared by President of Sierra Leone Ernest Bai Koroma and enacted by the Parliament of Sierra Leone in December 2010. The park amalgamates Gola North Forest Reserve, Gola East Forest Reserve and Gola West Forest Reserves, and is Sierra Leone's second national park.

The GRNP is Sierra Leone's largest tract of rainforest, and covers 71,070 hectares in the east of the country.   Recent biological surveys show that the forest is home to more than 330 species of birds, 14 of which are threatened, over 650 species of butterfly and 49 species of mammals, including a population of 300+ chimpanzees, pygmy hippopotamuses and a much dwindled forest elephant population.

The GRNP is part of the Upper Guinea Forest, a biodiversity hotspot that stretches from Guinea to Togo.

The forest has been commercially exploited in the past, with over 20,000 hectares being logged between the 1960s and 1980s, and has recently been under pressure for the exploitation of diamonds and iron ore and was the subject of a recent report by Global Witness.  However, since the 1990s, the forest has been the subject of a conservation project to protect the forest for the long term whilst ensuring the involvement and livelihood improvement of forest edge communities.  The project is a collaboration between the Government of Sierra Leone, the Conservation Society of Sierra Leone and the Royal Society for the Protection of Birds. A similar action has also been instituted across the Liberia border in the Liberian Gola Forest Community, since the two communities share similar cultures and people as well as animal and plant species. The Lofa-Mano National Park has been proposed in northeastern Liberia, adjoining the park.

Sources
 Sierra Leone Gazette Vol. CXLI. No 87 Dated 16 December 2010 'Proclamation for the Constitution of the Gola Rainforest National Park'

References

External links
 Official website

National parks of Sierra Leone
Protected areas established in 2010
2010 establishments in Sierra Leone